The 1977 NCAA Division III men's basketball tournament was the third annual single-elimination tournament to determine the men's collegiate basketball national champion of National Collegiate Athletic Association (NCAA) Division III, held during March 1977.

The tournament field included 30 teams, an increase of two from 1976, and the national championship rounds were contested in Rock Island, Illinois.

Wittenberg, runners up from 1976, defeated Oneonta State, 79–66, in the championship game to win their first national title.

Regional Rounds

Regional No. 1

Regional No. 2

Midwest - Rock Island, Illinois

Regional No. 4

Regional No. 5

Regional No. 6

Regional No. 7

Regional No. 8

Championship Rounds
Site: Rock Island, Illinois

See also
1977 NCAA Division I basketball tournament
1977 NCAA Division II basketball tournament
1977 NAIA Basketball Tournament

References

NCAA Division III men's basketball tournament
NCAA Men's Division III Basketball
Ncaa Tournament
NCAA Division III basketball tournament